The World Today is an Australian current affairs program which delivers national and international news and analysis to radio and online audiences nationally and throughout the region. It is broadcast on the ABC Radio National and ABC Local Radio networks.

History 
The show first aired on 21 June 1999.

In June 2020, ABC announced that Eleanor Hall would be stepping down from her role from August, after 19 years of hosting the program. Sally Sara has been announced as her replacement.

Presenters 

 John Highfield 
 Monica Attard 
 Eleanor Hall (2001–2020)
 Thomas Oriti (2020)
 Sally Sara (2020– )

See also
 ABC News at Noon

References

Australian Broadcasting Corporation radio programs
ABC News and Current Affairs

External links